Ensina azorica is a species of tephritid or fruit flies in the genus Ensina of the family Tephritidae.

Distribution
Azores.

References

Tephritinae
Insects described in 1945
Diptera of Europe